Andrew 'Andy' Charles Oates (born 1969 in Adelaide, Australia) is an Australian and British developmental biologist and embryologist specialized in biological pattern formation. He is professor at EPFL (École Polytechnique Fédérale de Lausanne) and head of the Segmentation Timing and Dynamics Laboratory at EPFL's School of Life Sciences. Since 2021, he has been dean of EPFL's School of Life Sciences.

Career 
Oates received an undergraduate degree in biochemistry with honors for his work at the Robert Saint's laboratory at the University of Adelaide in 1992. He then joined Andrew F. Wilks at the Ludwig Institute for Cancer Research and at the University of Melbourne as PhD student, and graduated in 1998. His postdoctoral time was at the laboratory of Robert Ho both at Princeton University and at University of Chicago, where he began his studies on the segmentation clock in zebrafish. In 2003, he moved to the Max Planck Institute of Molecular Cell Biology and Genetics in Dresden to start his research group. In 2012, he became professor of vertebrate developmental genetics at University College London and moved his group to the National Institute for Medical Research at Mill Hill in London. In April 2015, he became a member of the Francis Crick Institute in London.

In 2016, he joined EPFL as a full professor, where he is the founder and director of the Timing, Oscillation, Patterns Laboratory at EPFL's School of Life Sciences.

Since 2018, he has served as director of the EPFL's Institute of Bioengineering, and since January 2021 he has been the dean of the EPFL's School of Life Sciences.

Research 
Oates' research laboratory is composed of biologists, engineers, and physicists. It  draws on molecular genetics, quantitative imaging, and theoretical analysis in order to investigate populations of coupled genetic oscillators in  vertebrate embryos, termed as segmentation clocks. These systems drive the rhythmic, sequential, and precise formation of embryonic body segments, exhibiting rich spatial and temporal phenomena spanning from molecular to tissue scales.

The laboratory' contributions are the direct connection of genes to segmentation rhythm, and the discovery that the rhythm also involves physical, collective processes at multi-cellular and tissue scales.

Distinctions 
Oates is a member of the British Society of Developmental Biology. He is the recipient of the R.K. Mortenson Prize for Biochemistry 1991.

Selected works

References

External links 
 
 Website of the Segmentation Timing and Dynamics Laboratory

1969 births
Living people
Academic staff of the École Polytechnique Fédérale de Lausanne
University of Adelaide alumni
University of Melbourne alumni
Embryologists
Biochemists
Australian biologists
British biologists